Raghavulu may refer to:

 B. V. Raghavulu, the State Secretary of the Communist of India in India and a Politburo member
 J. V. Raghavulu (died 2013), famous music director and playback singer